Bad Boy is a collaboration and only album released by former Bad Boy Records artists, G-Dep and Loon

Track listing
"Callin'"- 3:42  
"Code of the Streets"- 4:21  
"Noodle"- 2:54  
"Remember"- 3:38  
"Special"- 3:31 (Featuring Styles P) 
"Shrimp & Lobsta"- 4:06 (Featuring Styles P) 
"Like Me"- 4:04 (Featuring Ginuwine) 
"Elmo"- 0:21  
"Jimmy"- 4:43  
"Blap Blap"- 4:55 (Featuring I-Rocc & Smigg Dirtee) 
"The Story"- 3:15  
"Outro"- 2:08
"We Are Nobody's"- 4:32

2007 albums
Loon (rapper) albums
G. Dep albums